This was the first WTA 125 tournament in Cali since 2013. Lara Arruabarrena was the champion when the event was last held, but she retired from professional tennis in August 2022. 

Nadia Podoroska won the title, defeating Paula Ormaechea in the final, 6–4, 6–2.

Seeds

Draw

Finals

Top half

Bottom half

Qualifying

Seeds

Qualifiers

Draw

First qualifier

Second qualifier

Third qualifier

Fourth qualifier

References

Main Draw
Qualifying Draw

2023 WTA 125 tournaments
2023 in Colombian sport
2023